Al-Ahsa or Al-Hasa may refer to:

 Al-Ahsa Governorate, a governorate in Saudi Arabia
 Al-Ahsa Oasis, an oasis region in eastern Saudi Arabia
 Hofuf, also known as Al-Ahsa, an urban center in the Al-Ahsa Oasis
 Al-Ahsa International Airport, Hofuf
 Wadi al-Hasa, a wadi in Jordan
 Al-Ahsa Eyalet, a subdivision of the Ottoman Empire, now part of Kuwait and Qatar

See also
 
 Ahsa (disambiguation)
 Hasa (disambiguation)